The Dolphins–Raiders rivalry is a National Football League (NFL) rivalry between the Miami Dolphins and the Las Vegas Raiders.

History
The Raiders were the Dolphins' first opponents during Miami's inaugural 1966 season. In that game, Joe Auer returned the opening kickoff 95 yards for a touchdown, but the Raiders went on to win 23–14. The Raiders dominated the Dolphins in their first 21 meetings, going 16–4–1 in that span. The two teams would meet three times in the playoffs in the early 1970s, however.

The first of these meetings came in the 1970 Divisional Round. In that game, Raiders quarterback Daryle Lamonica sealed the game in the fourth quarter with an 82-yard touchdown pass to Rod Sherman, leading to a 21–14 Raiders victory. The two teams would not face each other for two seasons, during which Miami became the only NFL team to finish an entire season undefeated during the 1972 season. Miami's winning streak would stretch to 18 games when they faced the Raiders on the road during the 1973 season. This game, which took place at California Memorial Stadium in Berkeley due to a scheduling conflict with the Oakland Athletics at the Oakland Coliseum, saw the Raiders defeat the Dolphins 12–7 behind four field goals from George Blanda. Miami avenged this defeat, however, defeating the Raiders 27–10 in the AFC Championship Game en route to winning Super Bowl VIII. In that game, Dolphins running back Larry Csonka ran for 266 yards and three touchdowns.

The Dolphins entered the 1974 Divisional Round as two-time defending Super Bowl champions, while the Raiders were seeking to return to the AFC Championship Game. In what became known as The Sea of Hands game, Raiders quarterback Ken Stabler threw an eight-yard touchdown pass to a tightly defended Clarence Davis, leading Oakland to a 28–26 victory and ended Miami's quest for a third consecutive title.

Though the Dolphins and Raiders would not meet in the postseason for the next 26 years, there were some notable moments that took place in between. In Week 2 of the 1975 season, Miami's 27-game home winning streak was snapped by the Raiders in a 31–21 defeat. Then in Week 3 of the 1983 season Dolphins quarterback Dan Marino made his NFL debut against the newly relocated Los Angeles Raiders, throwing his first touchdown passes in a 27–14 loss. In Week 14 of the 1984 season, Marino threw for 470 yards and four touchdowns, but Raiders running back Marcus Allen ran for 155 yards and three touchdowns, two of which came in the fourth quarter, in the Raiders' 45-34 victory.

However, this game ended rather quickly as the Raiders scored 20 first-half points and blanked the Dolphins in a 27–0 shutout. The loss was only one of five Miami would suffer since 1992, as they won 15 games to close the gap in the series. One of those wins took place at Wembley Stadium in London during the 2014 season, with Miami taking a 38–14 decision. The Dolphins also defeated the now-Las Vegas Raiders 26–25 at Allegiant Stadium in Week 16 of the 2020 season, ending the Raiders' playoff hopes.

Following the 2021 season, the Dolphins and Raiders each made the biggest blockbuster trades of the 2022 offseason by trading for Pro Bowl wide receivers; the Raiders traded for Green Bay Packers receiver Davante Adams on March 17, 2022, and just a week later, the Dolphins traded for Kansas City Chiefs star receiver Tyreek Hill. Also notable is the fact both teams have quarterback–wide receiver duos whom had previously played together in college, with the Dolphins having Alabama alums Tua Tagovailoa and Jaylen Waddle, and the Raiders with Fresno State alums Derek Carr and Davante Adams.

Game results 

|-
| rowspan=2|1966
| style="| Raiders  23–14
| Orange Bowl
| Raiders  1–0
| Dolphins' inaugural season. First meeting at Orange Bowl.
|-
| style="| Raiders  21–10
| Oakland Coliseum
| Raiders  2–0
| First meeting at Oakland Coliseum
|-
| 1967
| style="| Raiders  31–17
| Oakland Coliseum
| Raiders  3–0
| Raiders win 1967 AFL Championship, lose Super Bowl II.
|- 
| 1968
| style="| Raiders  47–21
| Orange Bowl
| Raiders  4–0
| Raiders lose 1968 AFL Championship. Last game for John Rauch as Raiders head coach.
|-
| rowspan=2|1969
| style="| Raiders  20–17
| Oakland Coliseum
| Raiders  5–0
| First game in series for John Madden as Raiders head coach.
|-
| Tie  20–20
| Orange Bowl
| Raiders  5–0–1
| Raiders lose 1969 AFL Championship. Last game in series for George Wilson as Dolphins head coach.
|-

|-
| 
| style="| Dolphins  20–13
| Orange Bowl
| Raiders  5–1–1
| 
|-
! 1970 playoffs
! style="| Raiders  21–14
! Oakland Coliseum
! Raiders  6–1–1
! AFC Divisional Round. First postseason game for the Miami Dolphins
|-
| 
| style="| Raiders   12–7
| California Memorial Stadium
| Raiders  7–1–1
| Raiders end the Dolphins' 18-game winning streak, first team to defeat the Dolphins since the 1971 Dallas Cowboys in Super Bowl VI. Game moved from Oakland Coliseum due to a scheduling conflict with the Oakland Athletics.
|-
! 1973 playoffs
! style="| Dolphins  27–10
! Orange Bowl
! Raiders  7–2–1
! AFC Championship Game. Dolphins win Super Bowl VIII.
|-
! 1974 playoffs
! style="| Raiders   28–26
! Oakland Coliseum
! Raiders  8–2–1
! AFC Divisional Round. Also known as The Sea of Hands game, where Raiders quarterback Ken Stabler converted a game-winning eight-yard touchdown pass to Clarence Davis amid three Dolphin defenders.
|-
| 
| style="| Raiders   31–21
| Orange Bowl
| Raiders  9–2–1
| This marked the first home defeat for the Dolphins since late in the 1971 season.
|-
| 
| style="| Dolphins  23–6
| Orange Bowl
| Raiders  9–3–1
| Last game in the series for John Madden as Raiders head coach.
|-
| 
| style="| Raiders   13–3
| Oakland Coliseum
| Raiders  10–3–1
| First game in series for Tom Flores as Raiders head coach. Last game in series for both Ken Stabler and Bob Griese.
|-

|-
| 
| style="| Raiders   16–10
| Oakland Coliseum
| Raiders  11–3–1
| Final meeting in Oakland until 1996. Raiders win Super Bowl XV.
|-
| 
| style="| Raiders   33–17
| Orange Bowl
| Raiders  12–3–1
| Final meeting between the Dolphins and the Oakland Raiders until 1996. 
|-
| 
| style="| Raiders   27–14
| Los Angeles Memorial Coliseum
| Raiders  13–3–1
| First meeting in Los Angeles. Dan Marino's first NFL game. Raiders win Super Bowl XVIII.
|-
| 
| style="| Raiders   45–34
| Orange Bowl
| Raiders  14–3–1
| Dolphins lose Super Bowl XIX.
|-
| 
| style="| Raiders   30–28
| Orange Bowl
| Raiders  15–3–1
| Final meeting at Orange Bowl. Last game in series for Tom Flores as Raiders head coach.
|-
| 
| style="| Dolphins  24–14
| Los Angeles Memorial Coliseum
| Raiders  15–4–1
| Dolphins' first road victory over the Raiders. Final meeting in Los Angeles. Only meeting in series for Mike Shanahan as Raiders head coach.
|-

|-
| 
| style="| Raiders   13–10
| Joe Robbie Stadium
| Raiders  16–4–1
| First meeting at Joe Robbie Stadium (now Hard Rock Stadium). First meeting in series for Art Shell as Raiders head coach.
|-
| 
| style="| Dolphins  20–7
| Joe Robbie Stadium
| Raiders  16–5–1
| 
|-
| 
| style="| Dolphins  20–17(OT)
| Joe Robbie Stadium
| Raiders  16–6–1
| Last meeting in series for Don Shula as Dolphins head coach and Art Shell as Raiders head coach.
|-
| 
| style="| Raiders   17–7
| Oakland Coliseum
| Raiders  17–6–1
| First meeting in Oakland since 1980. First meeting in series for Jimmy Johnson as Dolphins head coach. Only meeting in series for Mike White as Raiders head coach.
|-
| 
| style="| Dolphins  34–16
| Oakland Coliseum
| Raiders  17–7–1
| Dolphins' first victory in Oakland. Only meeting in series for Joe Bugel as Raiders head coach.
|-
| 
| style="| Dolphins  27–17
| Network Associates Coliseum
| Raiders  17–8–1
| First meeting in series for Jon Gruden as Raiders head coach. Final start in series for Dan Marino as Dolphins quarterback.
|-
| 
| style="| Dolphins  16–9
| Network Associates Coliseum
| Raiders  17–9–1
| Final meeting in series for head coach Jimmy Johnson.
|-

|-
! 2000 playoffs
! style="| Raiders   27–0
! Network Associates Coliseum
! Raiders  18–9–1
! AFC Divisional Round. First meeting in series for Dave Wannstedt as Dolphins head coach.
|-
| 
| style="| Dolphins  18–15
| Pro Player Stadium
| Raiders  18–10–1
| Last meeting in series for Jon Gruden during his first stint as Raiders head coach.
|-
| 
| style="| Dolphins  23–17
| Pro Player Stadium
| Raiders  18–11–1
| Raiders lose Super Bowl XXXVII. Only meeting in series for Bill Callahan as Raiders head coach.
|-
| 
| style="| Dolphins  33–21
| McAfee Coliseum
| Raiders  18–12–1
| Only meeting in series for both Nick Saban as Dolphins head coach and Norv Turner as Raiders head coach.
|-
| 
| style="| Raiders   35–17
| Dolphin Stadium
| Raiders  19–12–1
| Only meeting in series for both Lane Kiffin as Raiders head coach and Cam Cameron as Dolphins head coach.
|-
| 
| style="| Dolphins  17–15
| Dolphin Stadium
| Raiders  19–13–1
| First meeting in series for both Tony Sparano as Dolphins head coach and Tom Cable as Raiders head coach.
|-

|-
| 
| style="| Dolphins  33–17
| Oakland Coliseum
| Raiders  19–14–1
| Final meeting in Oakland. Final meeting in series for Tom Cable as Raiders head coach.
|-
| 
| style="| Dolphins  34–14
| Sun Life Stadium
| Raiders  19–15–1
| Only meeting for Hue Jackson as Raiders head coach. Final meeting in series for Tony Sparano as Dolphins head coach.
|-
| 
| style="| Dolphins  35–13
| Sun Life Stadium
| Raiders  19–16–1
| First meeting in series for both Joe Philbin as Dolphins head coach and Dennis Allen as Raiders head coach.
|-
| 
| style="| Dolphins  38–14
| Wembley Stadium
| Raiders  19–17–1
| NFL International Series played in London.  Officially a Raiders home game. Last game in series for both Dennis Allen as Raiders head coach  and Joe Philbin as Dolphins head coach
|-
| 
| style="| Raiders   27–24
| Hard Rock Stadium
| Raiders  20–17–1
| Only meeting in series for Jack Del Rio as Raiders head coach. First meeting in series for Adam Gase for Dolphins head coach.
|-
| 
| style="| Dolphins  28–20
| Hard Rock Stadium
| Raiders  20–18–1
| First meeting in series for Jon Gruden in his second stint as Raiders head coach. Last meeting in series for Adam Gase as Dolphins head coach.
|-

|-
| 
| style="| Dolphins  26–25
| Allegiant Stadium
| Raiders  20–19–1
| First meeting in Las Vegas. First meeting in series for Brian Flores as Dolphins head coach.
|-
| 
| style="| Raiders   31–28(OT)
| Allegiant Stadium
| Raiders  21–19–1
| Last meeting in series for both Jon Gruden as Raiders head coach and Brian Flores as Dolphins head coach.
|-

|-
| Regular season
| Tie 18–18–1
| 
| 
| 
|-
| Postseason
| style="|
| Dolphins 1–0
| Raiders 3–0
| AFC Divisional Round: 1970, 1974, 2000. AFC Championship Game: 1973.
|-
| Regular and postseason 
| style="|
| 
| 
|  
|-

Footnotes 
 Allen was fired after this game; with former Dolphins coach Tony Sparano serving as interim head coach

Connections between the teams

Coaches/executives

Players

*Offseason and/or practice squad member only

See also
National Football League rivalries

References

National Football League rivalries
Miami Dolphins
Las Vegas Raiders
Las Vegas Raiders rivalries
Miami Dolphins rivalries